Meridian Systems, a Trimble Inc Company, is a Plan-Build-Operate technology solutions provider for project-based organizations. Building owners, construction and engineering firms, and public agencies use Meridian software to manage capital building programs and facility assets. Meridian offers construction project management and infrastructure lifecycle management solutions for controlling project costs and schedules across the plan-build-operate project lifecycle.

The company was founded in 1993 and is headquartered in Folsom, California, in the United States of America. In November 2006 it was acquired by Trimble

References

Software companies based in California
Folsom, California
Defunct software companies of the United States